Kehychivka is an urban-type settlement in Krasnohrad Raion, Kharkiv Oblast, Ukraine. It hosts the administration of Kehychivka settlement hromada, one of the hromadas of Ukraine. Population:

History 
It was a village in Kharkov Governorate of the Russian Empire.

Urban-type settlement since 1957.

In January 1989 the population was 7151 people. In January 2013 the population was 6246 people.

Until 18 July 2020, Kehychivka was the administrative center of Kehychivka Raion. The raion was abolished in July 2020 as part of the administrative reform of Ukraine, which reduced the number of raions of Kharkiv Oblast to seven. The area of Kechyhivka Raion was merged into Krasnohrad Raion.

Economy

Transportation
Kehychivka has access to the Highway M29 which connects Kharkiv and Dnipro, as well to a road leading to Izium with further access to Sloviansk.

Kehychivka railway station is on the Southern railway connecting Krasnohrad and Lozova, with further connections to Kharkiv and Dnipro.

References

Urban-type settlements in Krasnohrad Raion